Gladys Guevarra (born February 22, 1977) is a Filipina actress, singer and comedienne, and a former housemate in Pinoy Big Brother.

Early life
Gladys Guevarra is a comedian and voice impersonator who previously worked in GMA Network, and was also the former lead vocalist of the band Gladys and the Boxers with K in which they were noted for their hit song Sasakyan Kita (I'll ride With You). She rose to prominence during her stint in GMA Network's noontime show Eat Bulaga!. She eventually left the show citing health reasons stemming from a bulging disk and scoliosis. But there were some rumors that she and co-host Janno Gibbs were removed from the show because of brewing a secret relationship. The former vehemently denies the allegations.  She entered the Pinoy Big Brother House on Day 46 to fill one of the gaps left behind by Ethel and Mcoy with the other reoccupied by Gaby. To add further confusion and mystery to her identity before her entrance, she imitated the voices of Annabelle Rama and midget actress Mahal. She then left the house on Day 58 due to depression.

Filmography

Television

Film

References

External links

1977 births
Living people
Filipino women comedians
Pinoy Big Brother contestants
People from Olongapo
Actresses from Zambales
Singers from Zambales
Filipino film actresses
Filipino television actresses
ABS-CBN personalities
GMA Network personalities
Star Magic
21st-century Filipino singers
21st-century Filipino women singers